The  ("wine quarter") or  ("area below the ") is located in the northeast of Lower Austria.

In the east, the  borders Slovakia at the March River. The river Thaya runs back and forth across the border.

Viticulture 
The name  is derived from viticulture; it is Austria's largest wine growing area. The most important grape varieties are:

Geography 

Beside viticulture and agriculture, other industries contribute to the  economy.

Important rail connections are Franz Josef Railway, the North railway and the East railway.

Districts
The following administrative districts of Lower Austria are considered to be parts of the 
 
 
 
 

Culture
 Vino Versum Poysdorf
 
 Falkenstein Castle

References

External links
 
Visitor Information - official Website 

Wine regions of Austria
Geography of Lower Austria
Gänserndorf District
Hollabrunn District
Tulln District